David Merry (1923 – 4 May 1944) was a Tobagonian first-class cricketer and Royal Air Force officer.

Born in Tobago in 1923, Merry was educated at the Queen's Royal College, where he played cricket and association football. He appeared in two first-class matches for Trinidad against Barbados, both in February 1941 and both at the Queen's Park Oval in Port of Spain. During these two matches, Merry scored 135 runs with a batting average of 45 and a high score of 80. He also represented North Trinidad in two matches of the Beaumont Cup, scoring 114 runs in his second appearance. Merry's final cricket match, representing the West Indies against Lancashire, took place on 7 June 1942 at Longsight. He gained 9 runs before being caught by Henry Butterworth and bowled by Winston Place.

Merry served as a flying officer in the Royal Air Force Volunteer Reserve during the Second World War and was assigned as a flying instructor to the No. 36 Service Flying Training School in Canada. Piloting Airspeed Oxford X6734 during a night training exercise on 4 May 1944, Merry died when the aircraft crashed near Penhold. He had held the aircraft steady to allow his pupils to bail out and was consequently killed. Merry is buried at the Red Deer Cemetery.

References

Citations

Sources
 

1923 births
1944 deaths
Date of birth missing
Tobagonian cricketers
Alumni of Queen's Royal College, Trinidad
Trinidad and Tobago representative cricketers
North Trinidad cricketers
West Indies One Day International cricketers
Royal Air Force Volunteer Reserve personnel of World War II
Royal Air Force pilots of World War II
Royal Air Force personnel killed in World War II
Aviators killed in aviation accidents or incidents in Canada
Victims of aviation accidents or incidents in 1944
Trinidad and Tobago aviators
Accidental deaths in Alberta
Trinidad and Tobago military personnel
Burials in Canada
Non-British Royal Air Force personnel of World War II